The Kittitian and Nevisian ambassadrice in Taipei is the official representative of the Government in Basseterre to the Government of Taiwan.

List of representatives

References 

 
Taiwan
Saint Kitts and Nevis